Adem Redjehimi (born 7 October 1995) is an Algerian footballer who plays for USM Annaba in the Algerian Ligue 2.

Career
In 2019, Adem Redjehimi signed a contract with USM Alger.

References 

Living people
1995 births
Algerian footballers
Association football wingers
USM Alger players
21st-century Algerian people